Leonard Wallace Gibb (8 October 1888 – 10 September 1967) was an Australian rules footballer who played with Collingwood and Richmond in the Victorian Football League (VFL).

Career
Gibb started out as a  player when that club was still a member of the Amateur competition. He played nine games with Collingwood before transferring to Richmond where he had the solitary game. After World War I, Gibb was appointed captain of Hawthorn (by this time in the VFA), and proceeded to be the club leading goalkicker for the 1919 season.

Notes

External links 

Len Gibb's playing statistics from VFA Project
Len Gibb's profile at Collingwood Forever

1888 births
1967 deaths
Australian rules footballers from Melbourne
Collingwood Football Club players
Richmond Football Club players
Hawthorn Football Club (VFA) players
Williamstown Football Club players
People from Hawthorn, Victoria